Viktor Nikolayevich Ivanov (born 29 August 1960) is a former Russian football player.

Career 
Ivanov was a product of the Neftyanik Omsk youth football system. He made his professional debut with Irtysh Omsk in 1979, and would make over 200 appearances for the club over eight seasons. He played in the Soviet First League with Rotor Volgograd, Geolog Tyumen and Uralets Nizhny Tagil, and in the Russian Top League with Luch Vladivostok.

References 

1960 births
Living people
Soviet footballers
FC Irtysh Omsk players
FC Rotor Volgograd players
FC Tyumen players
FC Shakhter Karagandy players
Russian footballers
FC Uralets Nizhny Tagil players
FC Luch Vladivostok players
Russian Premier League players

Association football defenders